Andrea Ellenberger (born 22 March 1993) is a Swiss World Cup alpine ski racer.

She competed at her first World Championships in 2019, winning a gold medal in the team event.

World Cup results

Season standings

World Championship results

References

External links

1993 births
Living people
Swiss female alpine skiers
Alpine skiers at the 2022 Winter Olympics
Olympic alpine skiers of Switzerland
21st-century Swiss women